Mercury is a defunct division of the American automobile manufacturer Ford Motor Company.  Created in 1938 by Edsel Ford, Mercury served as the medium-price brand of Ford for nearly its entire existence, bridging the price gap between the Ford and Lincoln model lines.  Its principal competition was General Motors' Buick and Oldsmobile divisions, and Chrysler Motors' DeSoto (until 1961) and Chrysler brands.

From 1945 until its closure, Mercury formed half of the Lincoln-Mercury Division of Ford, which served as a combined sales network (distinct from Ford) for its two premium automotive brands.  Lincoln-Mercury also served as the sales network for Continental (1956–1960), Edsel (1958–1960) and Merkur (1985–1989).  Through the use of platform sharing and manufacturing commonality, Mercury vehicles shared components and engineering with Ford or Lincoln (or both concurrently), serving as counterparts for vehicles from both divisions.   

Following an extended decline in sales and market share for Mercury, Ford announced the closure of the division at the end of 2010. The final Mercury automobile, a 2011 Mercury Grand Marquis, was manufactured at St. Thomas Assembly on January 5, 2011.  Mercury remains an active, registered trademark of Ford.

History
During the mid-1930s, under the leadership of Edsel Ford, Ford Motor Company discovered that it needed to expand its brand footprint to match its largest competitors.  In 1935, Ford offered only its namesake brand and the cars of its Lincoln Motor Company division.  In contrast to the comprehensive line of brands from General Motors (seven) and Chrysler Corporation (four), Ford offered its Ford Standard/DeLuxe V8 range and the Lincoln Model K.  In contrast to the Ford V8, the Model K was among the most expensive vehicles built and sold in the United States, rivaled in price by the Cadillac V-12 (and V-16), Duesenberg Model J, and the flagship lines of Mercedes-Benz and Rolls-Royce.    

To address the gap between Ford and Lincoln, Ford Motor Company launched its own version of the late 1920s General Motors Companion Make Program, leading the company to expand from two nameplates to five by the end of the decade.  For 1936, Lincoln-Zephyr was introduced as a sub-marque of Lincoln, giving the line a V12 car competing against the LaSalle and Buick, the Chrysler Airstream and Airflow, and the Packard One-Twenty.  For 1938, De Luxe Ford became a sub-marque of Ford, offering a higher-price V8 car with a model-specific interior and exterior trim.  

In 1937, Edsel Ford began work on Mercury; in contrast with Lincoln-Zephyr and DeLuxe Ford, Mercury was developed as a completely new brand.  Selected personally by Edsel Ford from over 100 potential model and marque names, the Roman god name had seen previous use in the automotive industry.  Along with its use by Chevrolet during 1933 (Chevrolet Mercury), Mercury was the name of seven separate companies from 1903 to 1923 (each failing within two years of opening), including a manufacturer of steam-powered cars in San Francisco, California, and the Mercury Cyclecar Company, a 1913-1914 cyclecar manufacturer at 807 South Scotten Street in Detroit.

In November 1938, Edsel Ford introduced four body styles of the Mercury Eight at the New York Auto Show.  Along with a two-door sedan and a four-door sedan, the Mercury was also introduced as a two-door convertible and a two-door trunked sedan; the body design was overseen by E.T. 'Bob' Gregorie.  While similar in concept to the modestly restyled De Luxe Ford, the V8-powered Mercury was an all-new car sized between the V8 Ford and the V12 Lincoln-Zephyr.

1939–1940s 
For 1939, the Mercury was launched at a starting price of US$916 ($ in  dollars); over 65,800 vehicles were sold in the inaugural model year.  In response to the popularity of the model line, Ford revised its branding structure after 1940; De Luxe Ford was discontinued as a sub-marque (returning to its previous use as a Ford trim line), and all Lincolns became derived from the Lincoln-Zephyr (including the Continental) as Lincoln retired the Model K.

For 1941, the Mercury underwent its first redesign; in another change, the model line adopted the Mercury Eight nameplate used in sales literature.  To consolidate development and production, the Mercury Eight shared much of its bodyshell with Ford, distinguished by its  longer wheelbase.  To further separate the two model lines, the Eight was given a model-specific grille, exterior and interior trim, and taillamps.  For the first time, a wood-bodied station wagon was offered by the brand. 

Unlike Ford products where components originated from the Ford River Rouge Complex and shipped in knock-down kits to dozens of cities across the United States, all Mercury vehicles only originated completely assembled from River Rouge until 1952 when Wayne Stamping & Assembly started production and was the only location that created Mercury components which were sent to only three cities that had dedicated assembly branch factories that completed Mercury vehicles until 1960. This approach was also used for Lincoln vehicles which only originated from the Lincoln Motor Company Plant until 1958 when Wixom Assembly Plant replaced the old Lincoln plant and completed assembly and became the component location for all Lincoln vehicles and the Ford Thunderbird and sent knock-down kits to selected branch locations in the United States.

For 1942, Mercury implemented several changes to the Eight. As part of an interior redesign, the Eight received a dashboard configured similar to the Lincoln Zephyr. To compete with Fluid Drive (Chrysler) and Hydramatic (General Motors), the 1942 Mercury offered Liquamatic, the first semi-automatic transmission offered by Ford Motor Company. Shared with Lincoln, Liquamatic proved complex and unreliable, with many systems replaced by conventional manual transmissions. As production was suspended following the outbreak of World War II, Ford produced only 24,704 1942 Mercury vehicles.  

Following the rise of Henry Ford II at Ford Motor Company in September 1945, the divisional structure of the company underwent further change.  On October 22, 1945, Ford merged Mercury with Lincoln Motor Company, creating the combined Lincoln-Mercury division.  While functioning as a single entity, Lincoln-Mercury would continue to market both namesake model line.  The Lincoln-Zephyr reentered production following the war, dropping the Zephyr nameplate; the Continental (and the V12 engine) ended production after 1948.      

On November 1, 1945, the first 1946 Mercury vehicles rolled off the assembly line.  In line with Lincoln and Ford (and virtually all American-manufactured vehicles), 1946 production was functionally unchanged from 1942.  The Eight underwent several minor revisions, including the return of vertically-oriented grille trim.  As few were installed before the 1942 suspension of production, Mercury did not return the Liquamatic transmission option.   Alongside the wood-paneled station wagon, Mercury introduced a wood-bodied Sportsman convertible.  For 1947 and 1948, few major changes were made.  The rare Sportsman convertible was dropped for 1947 and the hubcaps were restyled; 1948 Mercurys were effectively carryover.     

In 1949, Ford Motor Company launched its first all-new post-war designs for all three of its model lines.  In contrast to the 1941-1948 Mercury, the 1949 redesign placed Mercury and Lincoln within a common bodyshell.  Largely distinguished by headlight and grille designs, Mercury and Lincoln would also feature separately-trimmed interiors.  Mechanically, Ford, Lincoln, and Mercury each offered a separate version of the Ford Flathead V8.   

For many years after its production, the 1949–1951 Mercury Eight (most commonly in two-door form) would develop a following as a street rod, making an appearance in several films.

1950s
The 1949 redesign of the Mercury model line proved successful, with the division increasing its sales six-fold over 1948, becoming the sixth-most popular brand in the United States.  In contrast to competing medium-price brands from Chrysler and General Motors (and independents including Nash, Hudson, or Packard), Mercury continued to offer the Eight as its sole model line.    

For 1950, the Monterey name made its first appearance, denoting a special edition of two-door coupes (alongside the Lincoln Lido and Ford Crestliner).  Intended to compete against the hardtop coupes from General Motors, the Monterey simulated the appearance of a convertible through the use of a canvas or vinyl roof (though with a pillared roofline).  During the year, the one-millionth Mercury vehicle was produced.  In 1951, Mercury regained an automatic transmission option (for the first time since the 1942 Liquamatic), with the "Merc-O-Matic" 3-speed automatic (a rebranding of Ford Cruise-O-Matic).

For 1952, Mercury redesigned its model line, with two nameplates replacing the Eight.  The Monterey returned as a distinct model line, slotted above the base-trim Custom; both shared bodies with Lincoln.  In 1953, the expansion of the model line proved successful; after emerging from a war-depressed market, Mercury nearly doubled in sales, ranking eighth.  While Mercury would have subsequently higher yearly sales, at 5%, this is the largest market share ever held by the division.  For 1954, Ford replaced the long-running Flathead V8 (dating from 1932) with an overhead-valve Y-block V8, with Ford and Mercury receiving their own versions of the engine.  As a submodel of the standard Monterey hardtop, the Monterey Sun Valley was introduced, featuring a fixed-panel acrylic glass sunroof.  While offering an open-air interior, the Sun Valley was difficult to market in warm-weather climates (as the glass panel warmed the interior to uncomfortable temperatures).

In 1955, Mercury underwent a redesign of its model line.  While again sharing much of its bodyshell with Lincoln, the division adopted the three-model range of Ford.  As its premium model range, the Montclair was introduced above the Monterey (including the Sun Valley glass-top hardtop, for its final year).  The revision proved successful, as Mercury reached its then-highest sales.  The divisional structure of Ford was revised; Lincoln-Mercury was split (largely to accommodate the formation of the Continental division)  In 1956, Mercury renamed the Custom the Medalist (to avoid confusion with the Ford Custom).

For 1957, Mercury redesigned its model range, with a  wheelbase sized between Ford and Lincoln.  In a move upmarket, the slow-selling Medalist was discontinued, with the Monterey becoming the standard Mercury line.  Previewed by the 1956 XM-800 concept car, the Turnpike Cruiser (the pace car of the 1957 Indianapolis 500) was slotted above the Montclair, distinguished by its quad headlamps and retractable rear window.  In line with Ford, Mercury station wagons became a distinct model line, with the Commuter, Voyager, and Colony Park; all Mercury station wagons were hardtops.

In 1958, to accommodate the introduction of Edsel, Ford revised its divisional structure, with Mercury, Edsel, and Lincoln forming a combined division (M-E-L). The Edsel Citation and Edsel Corsair shared their chassis (and roofline) with Mercury, with the entire division overlapping Mercury in price (a key reason behind its failure). The Park Lane was introduced as a flagship model line on a  wheelbase (with the Turnpike Cruiser becoming part of the Montclair line).

For 1959, Mercury underwent a revision of its body, expanding to a  wheelbase.  Coinciding with the discontinuation of the Edsel Corsair and Citation, Mercury produced its own body and chassis (for the first time since 1940).  The division pared several slow-selling model lines, including the Turnpike Cruiser and Voyager; the two-door Commuter was in its final year.  Mercury was one of the first American full size cars to adopt parallel-action windshield wipers.

As with many medium-price brands, the Mercury brand was hit hard by the economy of the late 1950s.  While remaining eighth in sales from 1957 to the end of the decade, Mercury saw a 60 percent drop in sales in 1958, outranked by Rambler in sales.  While outselling the heavily-marketed Edsel by over a two-to-one margin; it would take nearly 1958 and 1959 combined to match the 1957 sales total.

1960s
While affecting the American automotive industry as a whole, the economic recession of the late 1950s had the harshest impact upon medium-priced brands.  While Mercury became fully distinct from Edsel (quietly discontinued at the end of 1959), the future of Lincoln-Mercury remained at risk, with the Lincoln division losing over $60 million from 1958 to 1960 ($ in  dollars ).  In response, several Ford executives (led by Ford President Robert McNamara), proposed ending the losses by streamlining Ford Motor Company down to its namesake division.  McNamara (prior to leaving Ford to become Secretary of Defense) allowed the division to remain, under several conditions.  Lincoln reduced its model line down to the Lincoln Continental (with a much smaller exterior footprint); to establish model continuity, the division shifted to a nine-year model cycle (the longest for an American brand).  To downsize its body and lower production costs, Mercury was to adopt the Ford body (on its own wheelbase).  In place of the five divisional bodies produced in 1958 (Ford, Lincoln/Continental, Mercury, large Edsel, small Edsel), Ford trimmed its full-size range to two for 1961 (Ford/Mercury, Lincoln).

For 1960, Mercury entered the compact car segment (a year before Buick, Oldsmobile, and Pontiac) with the introduction of the Mercury Comet.  Originally developed for Edsel, the Comet was sold without Mercury divisional badging until 1962 (similar to the original Valiant from Plymouth).  The Mercury counterpart of the Ford Falcon (stretched to a  wheelbase), the Comet was given four headlights instead of two; the standard engine was a  inline-6 (becoming the first Mercury ever sold without a V8 engine).

For 1961, Mercury introduced all-new full-size cars, shifting from a division-exclusive chassis to a  wheelbase version of the Ford Galaxie.  The Montclair and Park Lane were withdrawn in favor of the Monterey, Commuter, and Colony Park.  The Mercury Meteor was introduced as an entry-level full-size range; as with the Comet, the Meteor was originally developed as an Edsel before its closure.

For 1962, Mercury revised its model line, matching it closer to Ford.  To eliminate overlap with the Monterey, the Meteor nameplate was adopted for an intermediate, giving Mercury a counterpart of the Ford Fairlane.  For non-station wagons, Mercury introduced "S" sub-models to market sportier content; along with higher performance powertrains, the option packages included full-length consoles, floor shifters, and bucket seats with the S-22 (Comet), S-33 (Meteor), and S-55 (Monterey).

For 1963, two different rooflines were introduced on the Monterey as an option.  Similar to the Turnpike Cruiser and 1958–1960 Continental, Mercury offered a "breezeway" reverse-slant rear window.  In stark contrast to the breezeway roofline, Mercury offered the "Marauder" fastback roofline (shared with the Ford Galaxie 500XL); its aerodynamics helped Mercury gain ground in stock-car racing.

By the middle of the decade, the Mercury division had secured its future. No longer entangled with the failure of the Edsel brand, the brand competed closely against Buick, Oldsmobile, the middle of the Chrysler range, and the top of American Motors range.  For 1964, the full-size range underwent a revision; the Montclair and Park Lane were reintroduced above the Monterey, with the Meteor and S-models withdrawn.  For 1965, the full-size models underwent a redesign; while still sharing the underpinnings of the Ford Galaxie, many styling elements were adopted from Lincoln, with advertising marketing them as "built in the Lincoln tradition".

For 1966, the Comet shifted into the intermediate segment, effectively replacing the Meteor.  For full-size Mercurys, multiple rooflines were gradually phased out, with the fastback Marauder roofline discontinued in 1966 and the Breezeway roofline discontinued in 1967 due to the increasing availability of air conditioning units being integrated into the ventilation system.  After a two-year hiatus, the S-55 returned for 1966.

In 1967, Mercury introduced its two most successful nameplates, the Cougar and Marquis.  The Cougar was intended to bridge the gap between Ford's Mustang and Thunderbird; the Marquis that between the Ford LTD and higher-end products such as the Chrysler New Yorker, Oldsmobile Ninety Eight, and Buick Electra.  In various forms, the Marquis nameplate would survive until the closure of Mercury in 2011.  For 1967 it was available as a formal-roof 2 door hardtop.  Mercury's most luxurious 4 door model for 1967 was the Brougham, equipped like the Marquis, and available as a sedan or a hardtop.  It featured a "Breezeway" rear window that could be lowered 2 inches, and effectively replaced the blocky Breezeway roofline used on earlier Mercurys.

For 1968, the Mercury model range underwent two revisions: the Ford Torino-based Montego replaced the Comet as the intermediate model range; and the Cyclone, introduced in 1964 as a performance-oriented submodel of the Comet, became a standalone model range slotted above the Cougar.  In a bid to establish its credibility in the performance car market the aerodynamically-optimized Cyclone Spoiler II was homologated as the 1969 Mercury entry for NASCAR.

For 1969, the full-size Mercury line was given an all-new body and chassis.  While again shared with Ford, the Mercury model line underwent a major revision, with the Marquis expanded to a full model range (alongside the Ford LTD) and the Colony Park no longer marketed as a separate series; the Park Lane and Montclair were discontinued.  Serving as a replacement for the S-55, the Marauder became a standalone full-size model, competing against the Oldsmobile Toronado and Buick Riviera, powered with an available  V8.  To differentiate the Marquis from the Monterey, Mercury introduced hidden headlights for the former.  While still based on the Ford Mustang, the Cougar was available as a pony car or a muscle car, with an "Eliminator" performance package with an available 428 Cobra Jet V8.

1970s
During the 1970s, the product line of the Mercury division was influenced by several factors that affected all American nameplates.  While sporty cars would not disappear from the division, Mercury refocused itself further on building 

1970 marked the entry of Mercury into the subcompact segment.  In place of selling its own version of the Ford Pinto, the division commenced captive imports of the Capri (European Ford Capri) from Cologne, Germany.  Slightly larger than the Pinto, the Capri was marketed as a compact sports car rather than an economy car, becoming the first Ford Motor Company car in North America sold with a V6 engine.  While sold through Lincoln-Mercury, Capris sold in North America from 1970 to 1978 had no divisional identification.

For 1971, Mercury gradually distanced itself away from performance vehicles.  The Marauder and Marquis convertible were discontinued, with the Brougham name making its return.  Restyled along with the Mustang, the Cougar was repackaged as a competitor of the A-body coupes (Chevrolet Monte Carlo, Oldsmobile Cutlass Supreme, Pontiac Grand Prix) of General Motors. Slotted below the Montego, the Comet made its return as a counterpart of the Ford Maverick (sharing much of its chassis underpinnings with the 1960 Comet).

At the other end of the performance spectrum from the Capri, Lincoln-Mercury began imports of the De Tomaso Pantera in 1971.  Assembled in Modena, Italy, the Pantera was a two-door, mid-engine coupe powered by a  Ford  V8.

For 1972, the intermediate Montego line (based on the Ford Gran Torino) was redesigned with a body-on-frame chassis, creeping into full-size dimensions.  After years of losing market share to the Cougar, the Cyclone was quietly discontinued.

The 1973 model year brought major functional changes to the Mercury line, the fuel crisis notwithstanding; in various forms, all Mercury cars were given 5-mph bumpers.  The Marquis and Monterey were given an exterior update, adopting a "pillared hardtop" roofline (frameless door glass supported by a thin B-pillar).  As American manufacturers shifted away from convertibles, the final convertible produced by Ford Motor Company during the 1970s was a 1973 Mercury Cougar.

1974 marked several significant changes throughout the Mercury model range, transitioning towards higher-content model lines.  The Cougar underwent a redesign, shifting from the Mustang chassis to the Torino/Montego chassis, becoming the counterpart of the Ford Elite; in what would later set the design precedent for the model line for over two decades, the Cougar was styled as a Mercury version of the Ford Thunderbird.  The Montego saw a revision to its model range, as its fastback body style was discontinued.

For 1975, the Mercury model range underwent a series of transitions.  Following the discontinuation of the long-running Monterey, the Marquis became the sole full-size Mercury nameplate; to expand the model range, a new Grand Marquis was slotted between the Marquis Brougham and the Lincoln Continental.  Intended as the successor for the Comet, the Monarch led to a completely new market segment: the luxury compact car.  The model line was met with success, with examples used as personal cars among Ford executives (including Henry Ford II).  Following the 1974 discontinuation of its engine, Lincoln-Mercury ended its sales of the DeTomaso Pantera.

1976 saw the expansion of the smallest end of the Mercury model line.  Introduced in Canada in 1975, the Bobcat was the Mercury counterpart of the Ford Pinto, sharing its coupe, hatchback, and station wagon body styles.  The Capri was restyled with a hatchback and was renamed the Capri II.  The Capri II (devoid of any divisional branding) became the second most-imported car in the United States (behind the Volkswagen Beetle).

For 1977, Mercury made significant revisions to improve sales to its intermediate model range (its slowest-selling models). While technically a mid-cycle model update, the Montego was replaced by the Cougar, with the latter offering sedan and station wagon body styles for the first time. The Cougar base coupe, sedan, and wagon were counterparts of the Ford LTD II, with the Cougar XR-7 hardtop becoming a counterpart of the Ford Thunderbird. The revision was well-received, as Cougar sales nearly tripled.

1978 commenced the modernization of the Mercury model range, marked by the introduction of the Zephyr compact, replacing the Comet.  The counterpart of the Ford Fairmont, the Zephyr marked the introduction of the Fox platform, a rear-wheel drive chassis architecture that underpinned some compact and mid-size Ford and Lincoln-Mercury vehicles from the 1970s into the early 2000s.  After ending the importation of the Capri II in late 1977, leftover examples were sold through the 1978 model year.  Of the 580,000 vehicles sold; nearly four out of every ten 1978 Mercurys were Cougars.

For 1979, Mercury continued its modernization; as the division shifted away from performance vehicles at the beginning of the decade, the fuel crises of 1973 and 1979 sparked the decline of the landyacht.  Two years after General Motors downsized its full-size model lines, Mercury introduced a downsized Marquis; while nearly matching the Cougar sedan in exterior footprint, the 1979 Marquis gained interior space over its 1978 predecessor.  The Capri made its return, shifting from German-produced captive import to counterpart of the Ford Mustang; for the first time, the Capri adopted Mercury divisional branding.  Bolstered by the redesign of the Marquis and the popularity of Cougar XR7, the Mercury brand reached its all-time sales peak, with nearly 670,000 vehicles sold.

1980s
As Lincoln-Mercury entered the 1980s, Mercury continued the modernization of its model line, redesigning its entire lineup between 1978 and 1982.  Since the early 1960s, the use of platform sharing had left Ford and Mercury model lines styled virtually the same, differing only by grilles, wheels, badging, and minor trim.  Through the decade, designers sought to give Mercury its own brand identity while maximizing production resources.  Initially associated with full-size sedans and personal luxury cars, Mercury also diversified its model range.

For 1980, Mercury ended the model overlap between the Marquis and Cougar, as the latter was downsized into the mid-size segment.  In another change, the Cougar model range was pared down to the XR7 coupe. A longer-wheelbase version of the Zephyr, the Cougar XR7 was a direct counterpart of the Ford Thunderbird.  Poorly received by critics and buyers, sales of the model line collapsed (to less than one-third of 1979 levels).  Struggling to compete against newer designs, the aging Bobcat and Monarch were in their final years of production.

1981 saw Mercury revise its model line to combat falling sales.  A standard trim of the Cougar replaced the Monarch; a counterpart of the Ford Granada, the Cougar was largely a Zephyr with a formal roofline and Marquis-influenced fascias.  As in 1977, the expansion of the model line nearly doubled Cougar sales (though far below its previous rate).  Replacing the Bobcat, the Mercury Lynx was introduced as the counterpart of the Ford Escort.  The first front-wheel drive vehicle of the brand, the Lynx (as an option) offered the first diesel engine for a Mercury; three and five-door hatchbacks were offered along with a five-door station wagon.  For the first time, Mercury used the GS and LS trim nomenclature; in various forms, it would be used through the 2011 model year.

In 1982, Mercury introduced its first two-seat vehicle; the Mercury LN7 was marketed as a counterpart of the Ford EXP.  To distinguish the LN7, the rear hatchback was fitted with a compound-curve rear window.  For the first time since 1977, the Cougar was offered as a station wagon (replacing the otherwise identical Zephyr wagon, as Mercury shifted the model line upward in price).  While struggling against the Mustang GT in sales, the Capri RS also was given the 5.0L V8.

1983 saw a major model revision within Ford and Mercury, involving full-size and mid-size model lines.  Within the context of Mercury, most revisions were centered around the Cougar model range.  Reverting to its traditional role of a two-door coupe, the Cougar XR7 underwent a complete exterior redesign; adopting a far more aerodynamic body than its predecessor, the Cougar was styled with a notchback roofline (the Thunderbird, a fastback).  Under a mid-cycle model revision (to improve its aerodynamics), the Cougar sedan and wagon took on the Marquis nameplate (Ford renaming the Granada the LTD).  As the most popular full-size Mercury since 1979, the Grand Marquis became a distinct model line (alongside the Ford LTD Crown Victoria).  The Zephyr was discontinued after 1983 and replaced by the front-wheel drive 1984 Topaz.  Selling far under sales projections (less than 5,000 were sold for 1983), the two-seat LN7 was withdrawn in favor of its Ford counterpart.  Buoyed by Cougar sales, Mercury was the fifth-highest selling brand in the United States (the highest it would ever finish).

For 1984, the introduction of the front-wheel drive Mercury Topaz further ended model overlap within Mercury.  The counterpart of the Ford Tempo, the Topaz replaced the Zephyr while offering a sedan counterpart of the Lynx (in a similar context to the Volkswagen Jetta and Golf).  Along with advancing the use of aerodynamic exterior design, the 1984 Topaz became the first Lincoln-Mercury vehicle to offer a driver-side airbag (as an option).  The Topaz also marked the first appearance of the Mercury "stacked angle" brand emblem, used through the 2011 model year.  The introduction proved successful, with the entire division selling nearly 500,000 vehicles.

1985 saw few revisions to the Mercury model line, largely in preparation for 1986.  For the first time since 1980, the Cougar received a complete redesign of its interior, including an (optional) electronic instrument panel.  As a 1985½ model, the Lynx underwent a mid-cycle update, adopting flush headlamps and a black-painted grille (in line with the Topaz).  Intending to repeat the success of the 1970s Capri, Lincoln-Mercury began sales of the Merkur (see below), a captive import from West Germany aimed at European entry-level luxury cars.

In 1986, Mercury made a substantial change to its mid-size line as the Mercury Sable was introduced to replace the Marquis.  Along with a transition to front-wheel drive, the conservative design of the Marquis was to be replaced by one of the most aerodynamic sedans in the world (at the time).  While sharing most of its body with the Taurus (including its doors, roof, hood, and front fenders), the two sedans were externally distinguished by differently-styled C-pillars, taillamps, and the introduction of a low-wattage "lightbar" grille, which would become adopted by several Mercury car lines in the late 1980s.  To match the Sable, the Topaz underwent a minor exterior update, receiving composite headlamps and a lightbar grille.  Lincoln-Mercury continued sales of the Marquis alongside its successor through the end of the model year (retiring the Brougham trim).

1987 saw Mercury revise its model lines in a move upmarket.  The Cougar underwent an extensive mid-cycle revision (sharing only the doors with the 1986 body).  To distinguish itself from the Ford Thunderbird Turbo Coupe, the Cougar XR7 adopted a 5.0L V8 engine.  More popular than the Cougar in 1980, the Capri was discontinued for 1987 (after being outsold nearly 10 to one by the Mustang).  For the last time, Mercury offered the Lynx and the Grand Marquis two-door sedan.

For 1988, Mercury underwent multiple product revisions and updates.  For the first time since 1979, the Grand Marquis underwent an externally substantial update (to slightly improve its aerodynamics); the rarely-produced two-door sedan was withdrawn.  The Topaz sedan was redesigned, adopting a more "notchback" rear roofline than the Tempo; a grille (initially) replaced the lightbar.  Taking the role of the Lynx, the Mercury Tracer was the first Mercury car since 1960 with no US-market Ford equivalent.  The first Mercury assembled outside of North America, the Tracer was derived from the Mazda-designed Ford Laser (derived from the Mazda 323); American production was sourced from Japan and Mexico while Canadian production was imported from Taiwan.

1989 saw the 50th anniversary of the Mercury division, producing various commemorative editions of the Cougar, Sable, and Grand Marquis.  For the third time since 1980, the Cougar underwent a ground-up redesign, adopting a completely new chassis alongside the Thunderbird (keeping its notchback roofline).  Growing significantly in wheelbase (to improve interior room and handling), the Cougar was benchmarked in design against European premium luxury coupes.  For the first time, the Sable saw an exterior update (a revision to the lightbar to aid grille ventilation).  Far under sales projections, Lincoln-Mercury ended sales of the Merkur brand (see below).

During the 1980s, Mercury had largely succeeded in modernizing its model line and gradually separating its brand identity between Ford and Lincoln.  While Mercury was among the last brands to downsize and would have disastrous results downsizing its mid-size model lines (with the 1980-1982 Cougar), Mercury was among the first brands to integrate aerodynamic body design into its model lines and downsized its compact model lines (replacing the Zephyr with the Topaz).  In contrast to other American automobile manufacturers, as the 1980s progressed, elements of Mercury design shifted further from divisional (Ford) counterparts.  Originally intended for replacement, the Grand Marquis (the most profitable model line) saw little change in contrast to its smaller counterparts.

Merkur

For the 1985 model year, Ford chose to revisit the success of the 1970s Mercury Capri, with participating Lincoln-Mercury dealers launching the Merkur brand. Drawing its name from the German word for Mercury, Merkur sold German-produced captive imports designed by Ford of Europe, competing against European executive cars sold in North America from Audi, BMW, Mercedes-Benz, Saab, and Volvo (along with the launch of Acura).

At its launch, Merkur introduced the Merkur XR4Ti sports coupe, a federalized version of the Ford Sierra XR4i (renamed in deference to General Motors that had sold the GMC Sierra pickup truck in North America that was not sold in Europe). For the 1988 model year, the Merkur Scorpio was introduced, bringing the Ford Scorpio flagship sedan of Ford of Europe to North America.

Following the 1989 model year, Merkur was discontinued as a result of several factors. The combined model line fell below sales projections, partially due to an unstable exchange rate between the US dollar and the West German mark; at US$25,000 (approximately $ in current dollars), the Scorpio rivaled the Town Car in price, yet bore a close resemblance to the Taurus and Sable.  Merkur remains one of the shortest-lived brands in the modern American automotive industry.

1990s
Following the closure of the Merkur sub-brand after 1989, the Mercury division itself began its own major transformation during the 1990s.  While Ford still intended to keep the division as part of the paired Lincoln-Mercury division, distinguishing its model lines from Ford and Lincoln counterparts became increasingly imperative, along with marketing a model line in touch with consumers.  During the decade, Mercury would bring to market redesigns of its best-selling model lines and would diversify its product line, expanding into the minivan and SUV segments.

For 1990, in response to passive-restraint regulations, the Sable and Grand Marquis both adopted standard driver-side airbags (requiring a redesign of the dashboards).  The Topaz also offered a driver-side airbag as an option (as it had since 1984).

For 1991, the division strengthened its presence in the compact segment through the return of two previously-used model nameplates.  For the second time, the Mercury Capri made its return, developed as a competitor for the Mazda MX-5.  Assembled by Ford of Australia (which sold a Ford-branded version), the revived Capri was a front-wheel drive four-seat convertible mechanically derived from the Mazda 323 (as was the MX-5, though the Capri and MX-5 were unrelated to each other).   After skipping the 1990 model year, the Mercury Tracer made its return.  While again based on the Mazda 323, the Tracer also now served as a clone of the Ford Escort (with both model lines now becoming near-twins of the Mazda Protegé).  Alongside the body and chassis redesign, the Tracer model range underwent revision, now offered as a four-door sedan and five-door station wagon; the Tracer hatchbacks were discontinued (a body style still offered on the Escort).  At the larger end of the size scale, the Mercury Cougar regained its V8 engine (dropping the manual transmission).  Fundamentally unchanged since its 1979 downsizing redesign, the Colony Park wood-trim station wagon was discontinued after a short 1991 model year, as large station wagons had lost ground to minivans, full-size vans, and large SUVs.

For 1992, Mercury would undergo another extensive update, releasing new generations of its best-selling model lines.  Though retaining much of the style from the successful previous generation (and its chassis), the 1992 Sable actually carried over only the doors, roof, and powertrain from its 1991 predecessor.  The 1992 Grand Marquis underwent a larger-scale redesign, sharing no body commonality with the previous generation.  While the chassis was carried over, it underwent major handling upgrades; its all-new 4.6L V8 was the first overhead-cam V8 engine used in an American-brand car.  Far more aerodynamic than its predecessor, the exterior of the Grand Marquis was styled more conservatively than its Ford Crown Victoria counterpart (with the two model lines only sharing front doors).  Better-received in the marketplace than the Chevrolet Caprice and Buick Roadmaster (and the Crown Victoria), sales of the Grand Marquis doubled from 1991 to 1992, leading it to become the best-selling Mercury sedan through much of the 1990s and beyond.

Lincoln-Mercury gained its first minivan for 1993, introducing the Mercury Villager (see below).  The first front-wheel drive van marketed by Ford Motor Company, the Villager was slotted between the two sizes of Chrysler minivans.  With the exception of the Topaz compact and Cougar coupe, the entire Mercury line was renewed between 1991 and 1992, leading for sales to increase to over 480,000 (their highest level since the 1978 all-time high).

1994 saw the end of two long-running Mercury model lines.  The Capri was discontinued for the third and final time; along with declining sales, its Mazda donor platform ended production.  The Topaz (the oldest Mercury line) was also retired, remaining in production nearly unchanged since 1988 (1984 for the coupe).

For 1995, the Mercury Mystique was introduced to replace the long-running Topaz sedan (the Topaz coupe was not replaced).  A counterpart of the Ford Contour, the Mystique was developed from the Ford Mondeo "world car" introduced in 1992.  While the Mondeo was developed as a mid-size car in Europe, in North America, the Contour/Mystique fell closer in size to compact-size sedans, leading to negative receptions for small interior dimensions (in comparison to competitive vehicles).  The Grand Marquis underwent a mid-cycle revision; along with minor updates to the exterior, the interior was redesigned.

For 1996, the Sable underwent its second redesign.  Though again derived from the Ford Taurus, the Sable grew further apart in design from its counterpart (with the two model lines sharing little more externally besides the front doors).  The heavily-rounded exterior was poorly received by both critics and buyers, leading for sales of the Sable to fall by one-third from 1996 to 2000.

For 1997, Mercury debuted a new generation of the Tracer.  Though using the Mazda-designed chassis of the previous generation, the 1997 Tracer sedan adopted an all-new body.  In contrast to the Sable, the Tracer differed from its Ford Escort counterpart only through its grille, wheels, and badging.  The Mercury Mountaineer mid-size SUV (see below) was introduced as the first Lincoln-Mercury SUV.  Following the GM retirement of the Buick Roadmaster and Chevrolet Caprice, sales of the Grand Marquis increased nearly 20 percent over 1996 (as the model line competed largely against the Ford Crown Victoria, itself supported primarily through sales of fleet vehicles).  At the end of the model year, the Cougar coupe was retired (alongside its Ford Thunderbird counterpart) as sales of large two-door coupes continued to decline.

For 1998, the Grand Marquis received a second mid-cycle update, restyled with a larger grille and taillamps.  In response to the 1992-1997 Grand Marquis receiving a better marketplace reception over its Crown Victoria counterpart, both model lines adopted the formal roofline design used by the Mercury.  The Mountaineer underwent a minor revision to its front grille to further differentiate it from the Ford Explorer.

For 1999, the Mercury line saw multiple major product changes.  Discontinued the year before, the Cougar (see below) made its return in a far smaller and sportier form; for the first time since 1976, the Cougar was not produced alongside the Thunderbird (which remained discontinued).  A second generation of the Villager was released, growing in size over its predecessor; in contrast to the Ford Windstar, a driver-side sliding door was standard equipment.  The Tracer and Mystique were discontinued at the end of the model year (the latter was sold under a short run of 2000 production).

New market segments 
For 1993, the Mercury Villager was launched as the first Lincoln-Mercury minivan.  Completely different from the Ford Aerostar, the front-wheel drive Villager derived its name used for wood-trim Mercury station wagons.  The product of a joint venture with Nissan, the Villager was produced by Ford alongside the Nissan Quest; both model lines derived their chassis and drivetrain from the Nissan Maxima.  Sized between the two sizes of Chrysler minivans, the Villager was developed as a competitor for the Chrysler Town & Country and Oldsmobile Silhouette.  While more successful than its Nissan counterpart, the Villager would later decline in sales, primarily in response to newer competitors (including the Ford Windstar, Honda Odyssey, and redesigns of Chrysler and GM minivans).

For 1997. Mercury introduced its first SUV with the Mercury Mountaineer.  A segment once nearly exclusive to the Jeep Grand Wagoneer, the Mountaineer was developed in response to the Oldsmobile Bravada.  Sharing its body and chassis with the Ford Explorer (itself derived from the Ford Ranger at the time), the Mountaineer differed from the Explorer in its use of all-wheel drive (rather than four-wheel drive); a V8 engine was standard (initially).  In a styling theme adopted on nearly all succeeding Mercury vehicles, the Mountaineer used a silver "waterfall" grille with a large central Mercury emblem.

After skipping the 1998 model year, the Cougar made its return for 1999 under a completely new identity.  After serving as a personal luxury car since 1971, the model line was repackaged as a compact sports coupe (originally developed as the third generation of the Ford Probe).  The first generation produced with front-wheel drive, the 1999 Cougar adopted the chassis of the Mystique sedan, bodied as a three-door hatchback.  Alongside the loss of the V8 engine, the 1999 Cougar was the first version of the model line offered solely as a Mercury (though badged as a  Ford Cougar for export markets).

2000–2011
By the beginning of the 2000s, the Mercury division began to struggle in modernizing its brand image.  At the time, its best-selling model line was the Grand Marquis (having traded the distinction back and forth with the Sable since 1992).  Though highly profitable, the mid-60s average age of the Grand Marquis buyer was nearly two decades higher than what Lincoln-Mercury dealers sought to attract into showrooms.  Through the 2000s, multiple efforts were made to attract younger buyers to the brand, involving an extensive revitalization of the Mercury model line.  As the 2000 model year began, the discontinuation of the Tracer and Mystique pared the Mercury car line down to the Cougar, Sable, and Grand Marquis; the three vehicle lines were marketed to widely different buyers, with no common brand styling at the time.

At the beginning of the decade, Lincoln-Mercury was made part of Premier Automotive Group (PAG), which combined all Ford Motor Company subsidiary brands (outside the namesake Ford brand) under a single organizational structure.

For 2002, the Lincoln-Mercury division was removed from the PAG and reinstated as a distinct Ford Motor Company division; Ford shifted the focus of the PAG towards its European brands.  The Mercury model line underwent multiple changes, led by the redesign of the Mountaineer.  In contrast to the previous generation, the 2002 Mountaineer shared only the roofline and doors with its Ford Explorer counterpart.  The model line introduced several styling elements used by Mercury through the rest of the decade, including a rectangular waterfall grille and clear-lens headlamps wrapping into the hood; bright chrome was replaced by silver and satin trim.   Two model lines were retired at the end of the model year: the Cougar (declining sales, retirement of its Ford Mondeo-based platform) and the Villager (Ford ended its joint venture with Nissan to produce the model line).

During the mid-2000s, Mercury began a series of model introductions to expand its model line beyond the Sable and Grand Marquis.   For 2003, the Mercury Marauder made its return (after a hiatus of over three decades) as a high-performance variant of the Grand Marquis.  Developed as a 2000s competitor for the 1994–1996 Chevrolet Impala SS, the Marauder was styled with a nearly monochromatic exterior (as with the Impala SS, most examples were produced in black); as with the Cougar, the Marauder was marketed without a Ford or Lincoln counterpart.  Coinciding with the introduction of the Marauder, the Grand Marquis underwent its largest model update since 1992, receiving a near-complete redesign of the chassis to upgrade its road handling and durability (the exterior and interior underwent minor upgrades).

For 2004, Mercury made its return to the minivan segment, replacing the Villager with the revival of the Mercury Monterey nameplate.   The first Mercury minivan produced by Ford, the Monterey was a counterpart of the Ford Freestar (introduced as the third generation of the Ford Windstar).  The Monterey matched the Chrysler Town & Country and Oldsmobile Silhouette (and its Buick Terraza successor) directly in size; in a segment first, the Monterey introduced heated/cooled front seats.  After its second year on the market, the Marauder was discontinued (outsold by the Impala SS by nearly 6-to-1).

For 2005 and 2006, Mercury underwent a near-complete transformation of its model line.  For 2005, Mercury introduced its second SUV, with the Mercury Mariner joining the Ford Escape and Mazda Tribute; the Mariner also marked the return of a four-cylinder engine to a Mercury (last seen in the 2002 Cougar).  The Sable was in its final year and was replaced by two different sedans.  The 2005 Mercury Montego (again reviving a dormant nameplate) was the larger of the two lines (a counterpart of the Ford Five Hundred).  Slightly larger in exterior footprint than the Sable, the interior packaging of the Montego more closely matched the Grand Marquis in size.  The smaller sedan, the 2006 Mercury Milan (counterpart of the Ford Fusion) was sized closely to the introductory Sable from 1986.  As Mercury did not market a version of the Ford Freestyle, the division no longer offered a station wagon of any kind in 2006 (for the first time since 1940).

For 2006, a third generation of the Mountaineer was released.  Though the exterior received evolutionary styling changes, the redesign adopted many content features from the discontinued Lincoln Aviator SUV.  The Mercury Mariner Hybrid was introduced as the first hybrid-electric Mercury vehicle and the first Mercury fitted with a continuously-variable transmission (CVT).  The Grand Marquis received its fourth (and final) design update since 1992, adopting a reshaped grille (closer in style to other Mercury vehicles) and a redesigned instrument panel; a tachometer was fitted to the model line for the first time (the optional fully-digital panel was retired).

2007 marked the withdrawal of Mercury from the minivan segment.  Falling far under sales projections, the Monterey had struggled to gain market share against more established competitors, with Ford retiring both the Freestar and the Monterey, ending minivan production in North America after 21 model years.

For 2008, the Mercury sedan line underwent significant changes.  The Mercury Sable made its return, lending its name to an updated Montego, receiving a more powerful drivetrain and greater styling distinction from its Ford Taurus counterpart (replacing the Five Hundred).  The Montego had struggled in the marketplace (outsold by the Grand Marquis nearly five-to-one for 2007), with new company management insisting upon a nameplate with greater brand recognition.  Alongside the Ford Escape, Mercury introduced a second-generation Mariner (the Mariner Hybrid, 2009), adding more brand-specific exterior and interior design.  In contrast to the rest of the Mercury line, the Grand Marquis  had outsold its Ford Crown Victoria counterpart (supported nearly entirely by fleet sales) for over a decade, leading Ford to end retail sales of the latter.  During 2008, the Grand Marquis was overtaken by the Milan as the best-selling Mercury (a position held since 1996).

2009 initially saw no change to the Mercury line.  At the end of the model year, the Sable was retired permanently, as the nameplate revival led to the Sable becoming the slowest-selling Mercury; consequently, the 2010 Ford Taurus was developed without a Mercury counterpart.

For 2010, Mercury debuted its final model change, a mid-cycle revision to the Milan.  Alongside a restyled front fascia, the Milan Hybrid was introduced as the first Mercury hybrid sedan.  The Mercury Mountaineer was retired at the end of model year; along with its status as the slowest-selling Mercury, the model line had ended its model cycle (the 2011 Ford Explorer was developed with no direct divisional counterparts).

Following the announced closure of Mercury, the division released a shortened 2011 model year for the Mariner, Milan, and Grand Marquis.  Of the three, the Grand Marquis (last redesigned for 1992) was already slated for retirement at the end of the model year, as Ford had announced the closure of its St. Thomas Assembly facility and had ended further development of full-size rear-wheel drive successor vehicles (for Ford or Lincoln-Mercury).

Discontinuation 
In 2008, Ford introduced an advertising campaign starring actress Jill Wagner that focused exclusively on attracting female drivers to the Mercury brand in hopes of making it more relevant and profitable (standing in stark contrast to its late 1960s "The Man's Car" ad slogan).  The campaign was a failure, narrowing the brand image and buyer appeal of the division even deeper, and sales continued to fall.

From 2000 onward, Ford began to pare down the Mercury model line, reducing the number of divisional counterparts of new Ford model lines.  Following the lack of a Mercury version of the Ford Focus (to replace the Tracer and/or Mystique), Ford did not develop Mercury-brand versions of the Ford Freestyle/Taurus X, Ford Edge, or the Ford Flex (the latter two would enter production as the Lincoln MKX and MKT, respectively).  With the exception of the Grand Marquis (which had largely overtaken and replaced the Crown Victoria in retail markets since 1992, with Ford restricting the latter to fleet sales in 2008), following the 1999 Cougar (which began life as a 1999 Ford Probe), each Mercury sedan/wagon and SUV was developed with a direct Ford divisional counterpart.

On June 2, 2010, Ford announced the closure of the Mercury line effective at the end of 2010; the company intended to concentrate its marketing and engineering efforts on the Ford and Lincoln model lines.  In terms of overall sales in North America, the Mercury brand held a 1 percent share (compared to the 16 percent share of Ford).  After selling under 93,000 vehicles for 2009, Mercury had sold fewer vehicles than either Oldsmobile or Plymouth prior to their discontinuation.

For its two slowest-selling model lines, Mercury retired the Sable and the Mountaineer after the 2009 and 2010 model years; the two vehicles completed their model cycles without replacement.  The Mariner, Milan, and Grand Marquis were produced through the end of 2010 for a shortened 2011 model year.

At the time, Mercury vehicles were sold in the United States, Canada, Mexico, Puerto Rico, U.S. Virgin Islands, and the Middle East.  For 2010, 93,165 Mercury vehicles were sold, nearly 265,000 fewer than in 2000. As Ford announced the closure of the Mercury brand, signage related to the brand began to disappear from Lincoln-Mercury dealers.  To reflect the change completely, in December 2012, Ford renamed the Lincoln Division as the Lincoln Motor Company (its name before World War II).

On January 4, 2011, the final Grand Marquis was produced by Ford of Canada as the final Mercury-brand vehicle; with nearly 2.8 million produced, the longest-produced Mercury model line was second only to the Cougar in overall production.

Sales figures

Mercury in Canada

During the middle of the 20th century, the small dealership network of Ford Motor Company in Canada necessitated some branding changes to attract buyers into showrooms.  This was especially the case in smaller, rural communities in need of trucks, as these areas were served by either a Ford or a Lincoln-Mercury dealer, but rarely both.  Mirroring General Motors in Canada, Monarch competed against Oldsmobile while Meteor competed against Pontiac; Mercury trucks competed against GMC.

Following the demise of Edsel and its effects on the Lincoln-Mercury division as well as the Canada–United States Automotive Products Agreement, Ford largely integrated its model lines across the United States and Canada by the end of the 1960s.

Monarch

From 1946 to 1957, to attract buyers of medium-price vehicles, Ford of Canada marketed the Monarch brand in their dealership network.  Using much of the body and trim of the Mercury, Monarch was a three-model line with the Richelieu, Lucerne and Sceptre matching the Mercury Monterey, Montclair, and Park Lane, respectively. It was sold at Ford dealerships, offering an upgraded car from the standard Ford line.

Ford of Canada replaced Monarch with the Edsel brand for 1958; a poor reception to Edsel in Canada led to the return of Monarch for 1959.  The same year, the Ford Galaxie was introduced, shifting the Ford brand upward in price and content; fearing brand overlap with the Galaxie, Ford of Canada ended the Monarch brand after the 1961 model year.          

In 1975, the Monarch nameplate would again become associated with Mercury (in both the United States and Canada), becoming the counterpart of the Ford Granada.

Meteor

From 1949 to 1976, Lincoln-Mercury of Canada marketed the Meteor nameplate as its lowest-price brand to compete in lower-price markets (most closely against Pontiac). In contrast to the Mercury and the Monarch of the 1950s, which derived their bodies from Lincoln, the Meteor combined a Ford body with a Mercury grille and trim. The brand was marketed as a four-model counterpart of the Ford line (Meteor, Niagara, and Rideau; the Montcalm was added in 1959 to match the Galaxie).

For 1962 and 1963, Lincoln-Mercury of Canada dropped the Meteor brand, coinciding with the introduction of the namesake Mercury product line and as Mercury distanced itself from Lincoln in price at the beginning of the 1960s. In 1964, Meteor was revived in Canada (replacing the Mercury Monterey in the same market). In 1965, Meteor returned the Rideau and Montcalm names, using a Ford Galaxie body with a Mercury grille. For 1967, its equivalent of the LTD was named the Montego, renamed the LeMoyne for 1968 (as Mercury themselves adopted the Montego name).

In 1968, Lincoln-Mercury of Canada added Mercury badging to Meteor vehicles, gradually beginning to integrate Meteor into its model line. After 1976, the Rideau and Montcalm were discontinued, combined as a base Meteor trim level for the Mercury Marquis in Canada; Lincoln-Mercury of Canada dropped the Marquis Meteor after the 1981 model year.

Trucks

To increase the availability of its truck lineup in Canada, Ford introduced Mercury-badged trucks in Lincoln-Mercury dealerships in 1946.  Initially rebadging the Ford F-Series light trucks as the Mercury M-series, the product range was expanded to include Mercury-badged versions of the medium-duty Ford F-series (and its school bus chassis variant), the C-Series COE truck, and a Mercury version of the Econoline.  Sharing nearly identical bodywork with Ford trucks, Mercury-badged trucks were largely distinguished by a division-specific grille and exterior trim and badging.

Sold only in Canada, Ford ended sales of Mercury-badged trucks after 1968 (sales of the Mercury version of the C-Series COE continued through 1972); during the 1960s, the M-series shifted closer in appearance to its Ford counterpart.  Following the withdrawal of the M-series, Mercury permanently ended pickup truck production, not marketing another light truck until the 1993 Villager minivan.

Brand identity

Logo 
The first logo of the Mercury brand was its namesake, the Roman god Mercury.  Towards the early years of the brand, Mercury used its Roman namesake in a silhouette profile (with signature bowl hat with wings, as shown in the image).  This logo was briefly revived for 2003–2004, used in the alloy wheel centers of the Mercury Marauder.

In the mid-1950s, Mercury introduced "The Big M", the namesake letter with horizontal extensions at its bottom; at the time, Mercury was a prime sponsor of The Ed Sullivan Show.  After 1959, the "Big M" was replaced by a crest emblem.  In various forms, Mercury would use a crest emblem on its vehicles through the end of the 1980s.  While upper-trim models (such as the Grand Monarch Ghia or Marquis) would feature a crest on the hood or grille, lower-trim models (such as the Monterey or Montego) featured a crest in places such as the wheels.  For a time, the Marquis (later Grand Marquis) used a modified version of the Lincoln star emblem.

Following the 1967 introduction of the Mercury Cougar, the branding of Mercury vehicles changed; similar to the Ford Mustang pony emblem, the Cougar adopted its own "prowling cat" logo. During the 1970s, the Cougar became the most popular Mercury vehicle, with a "Sign of the Cat" advertising campaign launched by the division; commercials for all Mercury vehicles during this era ended with a shot of a growling cougar seated atop a Lincoln-Mercury sign (like the then-current outdoor signage at the dealerships, which also featured the Ford "blue oval" logo) and the voiceover announcer intoning "at the sign of the cat".  For 1977, the Cougar logo was revised from a "prowling cat" to a "cat-head" emblem, later adapted by the Mercury Lynx, Mercury LN7 and the Mercury Capri.

In 1984, Mercury introduced what would become its final brand emblem (pictured in the article information box).  Centered in the grille, the silver Mercury emblem is a set of three stacked obtuse angles (also in silver).  Introduced with the Mercury Topaz, the emblem was adopted by the Lynx and Sable, with the Grand Marquis/Colony Park adopting it in 1988 (on hood ornaments and wheels).  In 1999, the emblem saw a minor revision, with the word "Mercury" added to the top half of the emblem.  The emblem became the final design featured for a hood ornament of an American-brand automobile, offered as an option for the Grand Marquis for 2005 (for a single year).

Grille design 
The Mercury styling of the brand is most commonly associated with a waterfall-style grille.  First making an appearance in the 1946 Mercury Eight, the design was revived in the 1961–1964 Monterey/Colony Park.  The design would reappear in the debut of the Mercury Cougar, as designers sought to differentiate the model from the Ford Mustang.  During the 1970s, the vertical waterfall grille design was adapted by nearly all Mercury vehicles (except for the Capri and Comet).

In 1986, as part of the introduction of the Mercury Sable and a revision of the Mercury Topaz, the division introduced a "lightbar" front grille.  Using low-power light bulbs, the grille between the headlights was illuminated.  By 1992, the feature was adapted by all Mercury vehicles (except for the Cougar and Grand Marquis).

In 1997, as part of the introduction of the Mercury Mountaineer SUV, Mercury reintroduced the chrome vertical "waterfall" grille.  In place of the radiator-style grille of Lincoln, several grille shapes were initially used, before the division adapted a rectangular grille opening in the mid-2000s.

"Breezeway" roof 
In 1957, Mercury introduced the Mercury Turnpike Cruiser, featuring a roofline with a retractable rear window.  From 1958 to 1960, the feature made its return on the Continental Mark-series line, with a reverse-slant rear window (on both hardtops and convertibles).  For 1963, Mercury reintroduced the feature as an option for the Monterey; to streamline production, elements of the window design were shared with Ford station wagons.  From 1963 to 1966, the optional reverse-slant roofline with retracting rear window was unique to Mercury, featured by no other American brand.

Branding 
Following the replacement of the Mercury Eight by the Mercury Monterey in 1952, the division adopted a nameplate nomenclature for its model lines.  For the next six decades, the later Montclair, Medalist, Meteor, Marauder, Montego, (Grand) Marquis, Monarch, Mystique, Mountaineer, Milan, and Mariner all used nameplates starting with "M".  Beginning the 1967 debut of the Mercury Cougar, several nameplates were derived from big cats, including the Bobcat and Lynx (with the Sable also adopting an animal name).

Mercury woodgrain-trim station wagons used the Villager nameplate, in line with the Ford Squire name.  Reviving a nameplate used by Edsel wagons, Mercury used the nameplate for all station wagons from the 1960s to the 1980s (except for the Colony Park).  After becoming dormant in the early 1980s, the Villager name returned in 1993 (as the Mercury Villager minivan).

From the 1980s to the 2000s, Mercury adopted a common trim nomenclature across its model lines, with GS standing for a base-trim model and LS as a high-trim version.  For performance-oriented trims, XR was used (Cougar XR7, Topaz XR5, and Capri XR3).  From the mid to late-2000s, Mercury shifted its trim nomenclature in line with Lincoln, with full words replacing letter-based designations.

While the introduction of "F" nameplates by Ford was met with controversy in the mid-2000s, the reaction to "M" nameplates by Mercury for its product range was much less extreme.  Before the 1980s, the division had used the practice for many of its product lines; several recognized nameplates were revived by the brand (Marauder, Montego, Monterey).  While the Milan was outsold by its Ford Fusion counterpart (by a significant margin), the product line met with relative success, overtaking the Grand Marquis as the best-selling Mercury sedan in 2008.  The Montego struggled to gain market share against competitive sedans, partly due to model overlap with the Grand Marquis (in contrast, Ford had long ended marketing for the Crown Victoria and ended retail of the model line after 2007).

See also
List of automobile manufacturers
List of Mercury vehicles

References

External links

 

 
Car manufacturers of the United States
Ford Motor Company
Defunct motor vehicle manufacturers of the United States
Motor vehicle manufacturers based in Michigan
Premier Automotive Group
1938 establishments in Michigan
American companies established in 1938
2011 disestablishments in the United States
American brands
Vehicle manufacturing companies established in 1938
Vehicle manufacturing companies disestablished in 2011
Ford Motor Company Marques
Luxury motor vehicle manufacturers